Y2J is a Taiwanese rock band composed of two participants (Yuming Lai and Jane Huang) from the 2007 season of One Million Star, a singing competition. The band released its debut album "Live For You" on 25 August 2008.

The two-member band's English name is derived Yuming Lai's first initial (Y), the number of band members (2), and Jane Huang's first initial (J). The band's Chinese name "Shenmu yu Tong", means "sacred tree and pupil (of the eye)". "Shénmù" (神木), meaning "sacred tree", comes from a large tree in Lai's village which shares the name "Yuming". "Little Tong"  (瞳 tóng, "pupil")" is a nickname Jane Huang has had from childhood.

Member history 
Yuming Lai (Lai Ming Wei) (25 June 1984 -), was born in Taoyuan County (now Taoyuan City), Taiwan, to a mother of the Atayal indigenous tribe. He graduated from Yongfeng High School and the Grand Cathay Institute of Technology. In 2007, he decided to participate in the One Million Star Taiwanese singing competition. In January 2008, he was crowned champion of the competition.

Jane Huang (Huang Mei Zhen) (19 January 1983 -), was born in Taitung County, Taiwan. She is a member of Taiwan's Puyuma aboriginal people. In 2007, she finished seventh in the One Million Star Taiwanese singing competition, but her strength in the rock genre was clear. With the strong support of her fans, she became the popular vote winner.

In January 2008, the duo got their big break when they were signed to the Universal Music Taiwan record label. Since then, they have released a Chinese version of the song "We Rock" from the Disney Channel movie Camp Rock. In August 2008, their debut album was released in China, Taiwan, and other parts of East Asia, with music videos for the first single "Live For You" and several other songs.

Discography

Studio albums

Track lists
Live For You (standard edition)

 為你而活 / Live For You / Wei Ni Er Huo
 武裝的薔薇 / Armed Rose / Wu Zhuang De Qiang Wei
 愛在末日前 / Love Before Doomsday / Ai Zai Mo Ri Qian
 理由 / Reasons / Li You>
 愛鍊 / Chains Of Love /Ai Lian
 Be Your Love
 草戒指 / Grass Ring / Cao Jie Zhi
 終結 / The End / Zhong Jie
 美麗 / Beauty / Mei Li
 不放 / Not Letting Go / Bu Fang

Live For You (deluxe edition)

 為你而活 / Live For You / Wei Ni Er Huo
 武裝的薔薇 / Armed Rose / Wu Zhuang De Qiang Wei
 愛在末日前 / Love Before Doomsday / Ai Zai Mo Ri Qian
 理由 / Reasons / Li You
 愛鍊 / Chains Of Love /Ai Lian
 Be Your Love
 草戒指 / Grass Ring / Cao Jie Zhi
 終結 / The End / Zhong Jie
 美麗 / Beauty / Mei Li
 不放 / Not Letting Go / Bu Fang
  法仔鼓 / Fa Zi Gu
 Se-Ma-Se-Nay Ku
 組曲:理由/愛鍊 / Zuqu: Li You/Ai Lian / Suite: Reasons/Chains of Love

Guardian

 崩裂前聲嘶力竭
 守護者 (主唱︰黃美珍)
 好想為你哭 (主唱︰賴銘偉)
 寬恕
 轉淚點 (主唱︰賴銘偉)
 跟我一起怪 (主唱︰黃美珍)
 信徒
 耶路撒冷
 捍衛真愛
 Q & A
 親愛的是我 (Demo版) (主唱︰賴銘偉) (hidden track)

References

External links
Universal Music Taiwan official website
Universal Music Chinese blog

Taiwanese rock music groups
Mandopop musical groups
Taiwanese indigenous peoples